The 1985–86 New York Knicks season was the 40th season of NBA basketball in New York City, New York. The Knicks had won the first overall pick in the 1985 NBA draft in the league's first ever draft lottery, which they used to select Patrick Ewing out of Georgetown, who was regarded as the most sought-after prospect since Kareem Abdul-Jabbar in 1969 by The New York Times. He was signed to a six-year $17 million deal, the richest ever for an NBA rookie.

Despite Ewing struggling with injuries, he was named Rookie of the Year and was selected to play in the All-Star Game, however, he declined to play due to an injury.

Bernard King missed the entire season while recovering from his knee surgery.

Draft picks

Source:

Regular season

Season Standings

Record vs. opponents

Roster

Player statistics

Awards and records
Patrick Ewing, NBA All-Star Game Appearance
Patrick Ewing, NBA Rookie of the Year
Patrick Ewing, NBA All-Rookie Team

Records

Milestones

Transactions

See also
1985-86 NBA season

References

 Knicks on Database Basketball
 Knicks on Basketball Reference

New York Knicks seasons
New
New York Knicks
New York Knicks
1980s in Manhattan
Madison Square Garden